Zephyrogomphus lateralis is a species of dragonfly in the family Gomphidae, 
known as the lilac hunter. 
It inhabits streams and rivers in south-western Australia.

Zephyrogomphus lateralis is a medium-sized, dark brown dragonfly with brown and cream markings, and a lilac colouring on the side of its body.

Gallery

See also
 List of Odonata species of Australia

References

Gomphidae
Odonata of Australia
Endemic fauna of Australia
Taxa named by Edmond de Sélys Longchamps
Insects described in 1873